The leaden delma (Delma plebeia) is a species of lizard in the Pygopodidae family endemic to Australia.

References

Pygopodids of Australia
Delma
Reptiles described in 1888
Endemic fauna of Australia